Weddin Shire is a local government area in the Central West region of New South Wales, Australia.  The shire's major town is Grenfell and it also includes the small towns of Caragabal, Greenethorpe and Quandialla.

The mayor of Weddin Shire Council is Cr Craig Bembrick, who is unaligned with any political party.

Demographics

Council

Current composition and election method
Weddin Shire Council is composed of nine councillors elected proportionally as a single ward. All councillors are elected for a fixed four-year term of office. The mayor is elected by the councillors at the first meeting of the council. The most recent election was held on 10 September 2016, and the makeup of the council is as follows:

The current Council, elected in 2016, in order of election, is:

Heritage listings
Weddin Shire has a number of heritage-listed sites, including:
 Iandra Road, Greenethorpe: Iandra Castle
 Koorawatha-Grenfell railway, Grenfell: Grenfell railway station

References

 
Local government areas of New South Wales